Dasht-e Olam (also Romanized as Dasht-e ʿOlam) is a village in Otaqvar Rural District, Otaqvar District, Langarud County, Gilan Province, Iran. At the 2006 census, its population was 65, in 18 families.

References 

Populated places in Langarud County